Shurestan-e Olya may refer to:

Shurestan-e Olya, Qazvin
Shurestan-e Olya, Razavi Khorasan